In chemistry, 3,3,4,4-tetramethyltetrahydrofuran-2,5-dione is a heterocyclic compound with the formula , or (CH3)2(COC2COO)(CH3)2.  It is a white crystalline solid with a pungent camphoraceous odor.

The compound is also called 3,3,4,4-tetramethyloxolane-2,5-dione (its IUPAC name) or 3,3,4,4-tetramethylsuccinic anhydride, namely the anhydride of 2,2,3,3-tetramethylsuccinic acid, and sometimes abbreviated as TMSA.  It can be seen as derivative of tetrahydrofuran-2,5-dione (oxolane-2,5-dione) with two methyl groups replacing two hydrogen atoms on each of the carbon atoms in the ring that are not adjacent to the ring oxygen.

Synthesis and chemistry
The compound is soluble in petroleum ether.

The compound was described in 1890 by Karl von Auwers and Victor Meyer who obtained it by thermal decomposition of 2,2,3,3-tetramethylsuccinic acid.  It can also be obtained, in > 50% yield, from 3,3,4,4-tetramethylpyrrolidine-2,5-dione  Other synthesis routes include

 treatment of 2,2'-Azobis(2-methylpropionitrile) with sulfuric acid (1896) 
 decomposition of the hydroxy-lactone of 2,2,3,3-tetramethyl-1-one-glutaric acid with release of carbon monoxide (1927)

See also
 3,3,4,4-Tetramethyltetrahydrofuran
 2,2,5,5-Tetramethyltetrahydrofuran-3,4-dione

References

Tetrahydrofurans